Lindhardt is Danish a surname. Notable people with the surname include:

 Jan Lindhardt (1938–2014), Danish theologian, Lutheran bishop
 Jens Lindhardt (born 1946), Danish rower
 Thure Lindhardt (born 1974), Danish actor
 Tine Lindhardt (born 1957), Danish theologian, Lutheran bishop